is a spin-off series of both the Mario and Donkey Kong series, based on puzzle video games, marking the return of Pauline and the rivalry between Mario and Donkey Kong.

Mario vs. Donkey Kong, released in 2004 for the Game Boy Advance, was followed by March of the Minis for the Nintendo DS, Minis March Again on DSiWare, Mini-Land Mayhem in 2010 for the DS, Minis on the Move for the Nintendo 3DS in 2013, and Tipping Stars for the Wii U and 3DS in 2015. The latest title, a spin-off centering on Amiibo called Mini Mario & Friends: Amiibo Challenge, was released in 2016.

Development 
The history of the series can be traced back to the Game Boy version of the original Donkey Kong. Adding new abilities for Mario and 96 new levels, the game brought new emphasis to the puzzle element of the game's concept.

At E3 2002, a title called Donkey Kong Plus was put on display. During the show, Plus had a feature that allowed players to design and save their own levels on the GameCube, then copy them to the Game Boy Advance using a link cable. It was essentially an updated version of Donkey Kong '94, but the game had disappeared by the following year.  It was replaced with the pre-rendered graphics and gameplay additions of Mario vs. Donkey Kong. The Create-a-Level feature was removed from this version (but appears in its sequel). A level editor still exists within the game's programming, and can be enabled through a modification.

Main games

Mario vs. Donkey Kong 

 is a 2004 puzzle-platform game developed by Nintendo Software Technology and released for the Game Boy Advance. The game is the spiritual successor to Donkey Kong, which was released in 1994 for the Game Boy.

The game concept revolves around a combination of platform and puzzle elements, challenging Mario to find keys, reach a locked door, and rescue mini-Marios.

Mario vs. Donkey Kong was a return to the earlier arcade-style games that incorporated many elements from the Game Boy version. While its style was that of other games, the Rare design for Donkey Kong carried over. Donkey Kong, originally a villain, returns to this role in the game: wanting a Mini Mario clockwork toy, he finds that they are sold out at a local toy store. Enraged, he terrifies the Toads at the factory and steals the toys. This sets up the game's plot, where Mario chases Donkey Kong until he can take the Mini Marios back from Donkey Kong.

The game has hidden e-Reader support. Nintendo held a competition in Japan in which cards were distributed to 1,000 participants. Five level cards were released by CoroCoro Comic and another card was given away at the 20th World Hobby Fair. The game can save up to 12 extra levels.

March of the Minis! 

 is the sequel to the Game Boy Advance game Mario vs. Donkey Kong, a follow up to the Game Boy Donkey Kong game, though it is more puzzle-oriented, now that the player controls several Mini Marios with the touch screen instead of Mario himself. The game also features the return of Pauline, whose last appearance was in the 1994 Donkey Kong game, a Game Boy remake of the original Donkey Kong.  It features Nintendo Wi-Fi Connection. The DS Download Station Series 3 set of games features a short demo of the game. This is the sixth Mario game for the Nintendo DS.

Minis March Again! 

 is a puzzle video game for the Nintendo DSi. Announced at E3 2009, it is the third game in the Mario vs. Donkey Kong series. It was released via the Nintendo DSiWare download service in North America on June 8, 2009, in Europe on August 21, 2009 and in Japan on October 7, 2009.  It is the first DSiWare game to feature a level editor in which players can create custom-made levels and send them to players on other devices via a wireless Internet connection.

Mini-Land Mayhem! 

 is a puzzle video game developed by Nintendo Software Technology and published by Nintendo for the Nintendo DS. It was announced at E3 2010 and released in North America on November 14, 2010. It is the fourth game in the Mario vs. Donkey Kong series.

Tipping Stars 

 is a puzzle video game for the Nintendo 3DS and Wii U and the sixth game in the Mario vs. Donkey Kong series. It was released in March 2015 on the Nintendo eShop for all regions, although it was also available at retail in Japan. This is the first Nintendo-published title to support a cross-purchase concept.

A possible entry for the Mario vs. Donkey Kong series for the Wii U was displayed as a demo at GDC 2014. It was developed with Nintendo Web Framework to show their capabilities. Like the other entries, the goal of each level is to guide the Mini Marios to the exit, creating paths through the positioning of platforms and other interactions with the setting made through the Wii U GamePad. The first level shows the basic capabilities of the program, but the second has more complex lighting effects and animations. It was later confirmed as a new official entry in the series at E3 2014, to be released as a downloadable Wii U eShop title. in 2015. During a Nintendo Direct on January 14, 2015, it was confirmed the game would also be released for Nintendo 3DS.

Other games

Minis on the Move 

 is a puzzle video game for the Nintendo 3DS and is the fifth game in the Mario vs. Donkey Kong series. Unlike in previous entries, Donkey Kong no longer has an antagonistic role and instead serves as one of the game's hosts along with Mario and Pauline. Using the touch screen, players must place blocks on a grid to guide the Mini characters to the end of each course. It was released exclusively via the Nintendo eShop download service on May 9, 2013, in Europe and North America and July 24 in Japan.

Amiibo Challenge 

On April 28, 2016, Nintendo released Mini Mario & Friends: Amiibo Challenge, a free downloadable game for the Nintendo 3DS and Wii U. This game has similar gameplay to the previous Mario vs. Donkey Kong games, and allows players to unlock various characters—including Mini Mario, Mini Luigi, Mini Peach, Mini Toad, Mini Donkey Kong, Mini Bowser, Mini Bowser Jr., Mini Diddy Kong, Mini Yoshi, and Mini Rosalina—by scanning their respective Amiibo figures.

Notes

References 

 
Donkey Kong platform games
Mario puzzle games
Nintendo franchises
Fictional rivalries
Video game franchises introduced in 2004